In communications, transactive communication occurs when sources transmit messages to one another simultaneously and send back acknowledgment messages.

References

See also
 Interactive communication

Telecommunication theory